Johannes (van Waveren) Hudde (23 April 1628 – 15 April 1704) was a burgomaster (mayor) of Amsterdam between 1672 – 1703, a mathematician and governor of the Dutch East India Company. 

As a "burgemeester" of Amsterdam he ordered that the city canals should be flushed at high tide and that the polluted water of the town "secreten" should be diverted to pits outside the town instead of into the canals. He also promoted hygiene in and around the town's water supply. "Hudde's stones" were marker stones that were used to mark the summer high water level at several points in the city. They later were the foundation for the "NAP", the now Europe-wide system for measuring water levels.

Mathematical work

Hudde studied law at the University of Leiden, but turned to mathematics under the influence of his teacher Frans van Schooten. From 1654 to 1663 he worked under van Schooten.

La Géométrie (1637) by René Descartes provided an introduction to analytic geometry in French, whereas Latin was still the international language of science. Schooten and his students including Hudde, Johan de Witt and Hendrik van Heuraet published a Latin translation of La Geometrie in 1659. Each of the students added to the work. Hudde's contribution described Hudde's rules and made a study of maxima and minima.

Hudde corresponded with Baruch Spinoza and Christiaan Huygens, Johann Bernoulli, Isaac Newton and Leibniz. Newton and Leibniz mention Hudde many times and used some of his ideas in their own work on infinitesimal calculus.

See also
History of group theory
Mercator series
Tangent

References

 Karlheinz Haas (1956) "Die mathematischen Arbeiten von Johann Hudde (1628 to 1704) Bürgermeister von Amsterdam", Centaurus 4: 235–84 
 J. Hudde (1656) Specilla circularia (circular Lens, in Dutch)

External links

 Tomb of Johannes Hudde at Oude Kerk from Gravenopinternet

1628 births
1704 deaths
17th-century Dutch mathematicians
Mayors of Amsterdam
Scientists from Amsterdam
Leiden University alumni
Administrators of the Dutch East India Company
Burials at the Oude Kerk, Amsterdam
17th-century Dutch politicians
18th-century Dutch politicians
People associated with Baruch Spinoza